The Minnesota Pipe Line (or MPL) is a crude oil pipeline that runs from Clearbrook, Minnesota southward to the Twin Cities.  Construction began in 2007 after the State of Minnesota approved the building permit, and ended in 2008; it is owned by Minnesota Pipe Line Company, LLC (MPL) and is operated by Koch Pipeline Company, a wholly owned, indirect subsidiary of Koch Industries.

The original proposed route ran through an organic farm; the owners of the farm negotiated with MPL, as a result of which MPL agreed to route the pipeline around the farm and more generally "to implement what they believe was the first organic agriculture mitigation plan in the country applicable to pipeline infrastructure. This agreement was made part of the record of the MinnCan pipeline routing proceeding."

The pipeline is largely fed by the Enbridge Pipeline System that carries crude from Alberta, Canada.   It splits into two parts at a junction in Cottage Grove, Minnesota.  One branch serves the Pine Bend Refinery owned by Flint Hills Resources (another Koch subsidiary) in Rosemount.  The other portion of the line runs to Northern Tier Energy's St. Paul Park Refinery in St. Paul Park, Minnesota.  There is a connection at the Pine Bend Refinery to the Wood River Pipeline, which currently carries crude oil from the St. Louis, Missouri area to Minnesota.

Minnesota Pipe Line system

References

Transportation in Minnesota
Energy infrastructure in Minnesota
Crude oil pipelines in the United States
Koch Industries
Oil pipelines in Minnesota